Action Box is an EP by punk blues band Boss Hog.

Track listing

All songs written by Boss Hog except where noted.

Band members

 Cristina Martinez
 Jon Spencer
 Charlie Ondras
 Kurt Wolf
 Jens Jurgensen

Additional personnel
 Simon Askew and Dave McCarthy – engineering on "Big Fish" and "Bunny Fly"
 JG Thirlwell, Bob Bert & Charlie Ondras – guest vocals on "Black Throat" and "Not Guilty"

References

External links
 

1991 EPs
Amphetamine Reptile Records EPs
Boss Hog albums